The 2015 Kangaroo Cup was a professional tennis tournament played on outdoor hard courts. It was the nineteenth edition of the tournament and part of the 2015 ITF Women's Circuit, offering a total of $75,000 in prize money. It took place in Gifu, Japan, on 27 April–3 May 2015.

Singles main draw entrants

Seeds 

 1 Rankings as of 20 April 2015

Other entrants 
The following players received wildcards into the singles main draw:
  Yuko Adachi
  Miyu Kato
  Ayumi Morita
  Miki Ukai

The following players received entry from the qualifying draw:
  Mana Ayukawa
  Mayo Hibi
  Ivana Jorović
  Erika Sema

Champions

Singles

 Zheng Saisai def.  Naomi Osaka, 3–6, 7–5, 6–4

Doubles

 Wang Yafan /  Xu Yifan def.  An-Sophie Mestach /  Emily Webley-Smith, 6–2, 6–3

External links 
 2015 Kangaroo Cup at ITFtennis.com
 Official website 

2015 ITF Women's Circuit
2015
2015 in Japanese tennis